Live Free or Die is an American 2006 black comedy film starring Aaron Stanford, Paul Schneider, Zooey Deschanel, Michael Rapaport, Judah Friedlander, Kevin Dunn, and Ebon Moss-Bachrach.  It was written and directed by former Seinfeld writers Gregg Kavet and Andy Robin. The film was shot in 2004.

Plot
A clueless, aspiring criminal named John "Rugged" Rudgate spends his days forging rebate coupons and selling speakers out the back of his van. One day, Rugged runs into an old acquaintance, the dim-witted Jeff Lagrand, who recently returned home to help his cynical sister run the storage facility that they inherited from their father. When Rugged tries to force his way into the Lagrand family business, things go terribly wrong—and the situation gets even more complicated when an emotionally unstable cop begins investigating.

Filming & Production
Most of the film was shot in 2004.

Reception
The film-review aggregate website Rotten Tomatoes gave the film a 40% approval rating. Film critic Frank Lovece of Film Journal International praised Aaron Stanford as "the young Steve Buscemi" and wrote that despite the film's "lack of visual click, Live Free or Die manages to be poignant without even being maudlin" and that "none of the movie's flaws negate its many remarkable little performances and casually insightful script.'

See also
Live Free or Die

References

External links

2006 films
American comedy films
Films set in New Hampshire
Films shot in New Hampshire
2006 comedy films
2000s English-language films
2000s American films